Bernhard Güntner (born 28 July 1962) is a German taekwondo practitioner. He competed in the men's featherweight at the 1988 Summer Olympics.

References

External links
 

German male taekwondo practitioners
Olympic taekwondo practitioners of Germany
Taekwondo practitioners at the 1988 Summer Olympics
1962 births
Living people
People from Ellwangen
Sportspeople from Stuttgart (region)